Mary Augusta Hiester Reid (10 April 1854 – 4 October 1921) was an American-born Canadian painter and teacher. She was best known as a painter of floral still lifes, some of them called "devastatingly expressive" by a contemporary author, and by 1890 she was thought to be the most important flower painter in Canada. She also painted domesticated landscapes, night scenes, and, less frequently, studio interiors and figure studies.  Her work as a painter is related in a broad sense to Tonalism and Aestheticism or "art for art's sake".

She was made a member of the Ontario Society of Artists in 1887, and in 1907 became only the second woman to serve on its executive committee. She was also one of the first women to be elected an Associate of the Royal Canadian Academy of Arts (RCA) in 1893. She was elected to join the Canadian Society of Applied Art in 1904.

Biography
]
Reid was born in Reading, Pennsylvania on April 10, 1854. From 1883 to 1885, Reid studied painting  at the Pennsylvania Academy of the Fine Arts with Thomas Eakins. In the Academy, she met her future husband Canadian artist George Agnew Reid (1860–1947). From 1888 to 1889, she studied at the Académie Colarossi in Paris, taking costume-study and life classes. She studied there again in 1896.

During the 19th and early 20th century, at the time of her schooling, women were rarely allowed to pursue art as a career. If they attended art school, they were often not taught the same subjects as men. Although they both attended art school, Mary was restricted to traditionally feminine themes, and in turn became known for her flower paintings. Despite the expectations for women to remain at home and care for children, Mary rose to prominence and became one of the first women to have her work included in the National Gallery of Canada.

Reid exhibited her work at the Palace of Fine Arts at the 1893 World's Columbian Exposition in Chicago, Illinois and at the exhibitions of the Ontario Society of Artists and the Royal Canadian Academy of Arts, the Art Association of Montreal, the Women's Art Association of Canada, and the Canadian National Exhibition. She also exhibited her work at the Pan-American exposition in Buffalo (1901), and the Canadian exhibition at the Louisiana Purchase Exposition in St Louis (1904), with Mary Evelyn Wrinch at the galleries of the Art Metropole in Toronto (1912), and with her husband and Wrinch at the Royal Ontario Museum, in aid of the Red Cross Society (1915). In addition to producing paintings that were widely admired, Mary became financially successful and received significant reviews in the Toronto press. In 1893, she was elected an Associate of the Royal Canadian Academy of Arts, one of the first women elected.

Legacy
A retrospective show of Reid's work was held in 1922 at the Art Gallery of Toronto, following her death on October 4, 1921. It included 308 works. She was the first woman to posthumously receive a solo retrospective exhibition at that institution. In 2000, Mary Hiester Reid's work was rediscovered (suggested CBC Radio, 21 June 2020) when the Art Gallery of Ontario held an exhibition of her work, Quiet Harmony: The Art of Mary Hiester Reid, curated by Brian Foss and Janice Anderson. Flower Diary: In Which Mary Hiester Reid Paints, Travels, Marries & Opens a Door, a biography of the artist by Molly Peacock has been published by ECW Press in 2021. In 2021, the Art Gallery of Ontario exhibited The Open Door: Mary Hiester Reid and Helen McNicoll.

See also 

 Ontario Society of Artists

Gallery

References

Bibliography 
 The Pennsylvania Academy and its women, 1850–1920: May 3 – June 16, 1974 Pennsylvania Academy of the Fine Arts, Philadelphia, Pennsylvania (exhibition catalogue). Philadelphia, PA: Pennsylvania Academy of the Fine Arts, 1974.

External links 

Mary Hiester Reid: Life & Work by Andrea Terry
Mary Hiester Reid - National Gallery of Canada
Artwork by Mary Hiester Reid

1854 births
1921 deaths
19th-century Canadian painters
19th-century Canadian women artists
20th-century Canadian painters
20th-century Canadian women artists
Académie Colarossi alumni
Artists from Pennsylvania
Pennsylvania Academy of the Fine Arts alumni
Students of Thomas Eakins
Canadian women painters
Members of the Royal Canadian Academy of Arts